Stoughton may refer to:

Places
in the United States of America:
Stoughton, Massachusetts
Stoughton (MBTA station)
Stoughton, Wisconsin
Stoughton Hall, Harvard Yard, Cambridge, Massachusetts

In England:
Stoughton, Leicestershire
Stoughton, Surrey
Stoughton, West Sussex
Stoulton, Worcestershire

In Canada:
Stoughton, Saskatchewan

People
Edwin H. Stoughton, Union general during the American Civil War
William Stoughton (Massachusetts), chief justice at the Salem Witch Trials